The Norwegian Water Resources and Energy Directorate ( or NVE) is a Norwegian government agency established in 1921. It is under the Ministry of Petroleum and Energy and regulates the country's water resources and energy supply. Its mandate includes contingency planning for floods, serving as a centre of expertise for hydrology, research and development, and increasing energy efficiency. It is a member of the Council of European Energy Regulators.

The directorate is based in Oslo, and has regional offices in Hamar, Førde, Tønsberg, Trondheim and Narvik. It also establishes international contacts and undertakes work abroad in developing countries for the Norwegian Agency for Development Cooperation. , it has over 400 employees. Its website includes statistics on Norwegian energy consumption, production and prices and a database of Norwegian lakes and water catchment areas.

The directorate holds administrative responsibility for the Watercourse Regulation Act (1917), Industrial Concession Act (1917), Energy Act (1990) and Water Resources Act (2000). Within the scope of these acts, the directorate can also issue new regulations.

References
Presentation of NVE - Brochure, accessed 2 April 2006.

External links

NVE homepage, accessed 2 April 2006 
This is NVE, accessed 2 April 2006

Water Resources and Energy Directorate
Energy in Norway
1921 establishments in Norway
Government agencies established in 1921
Hydrology organizations
Norway
Ministry of Petroleum and Energy
Natural resources agencies